Christos Tsolakopoulos (1868–1923) was a Hellenic Army officer. Tsolakopoulos was born on 1 January 1868 in Nafplio. He enlisted in the Hellenic Army as a volunteer on 15 August 1886. While a student at the NCO School, he participated in the Greco-Turkish War of 1897. On 9 August 1899 he graduated from the NCO School as an Infantry 2nd Lieutenant. In 1905, during the early stages of the Macedonian Struggle, he led an armed band in the area of Morihovo with the nom de guerre of Kapetan Rembelos (Καπετάν Ρέμπελος).

During the Balkan Wars of 1912–13 he fought as an officer in the 8th Infantry Regiment, and was wounded in the siege of Ioannina. He particularly distinguished himself during the Battle of Kilkis–Lachanas in the Second Balkan War. Serving as adjutant of the regimental commander, Col. Kambanis, he concealed the Colonel's death from the troops and took over command of the regiment until the end of the battle. In 1917–18 he served as commander of the 35th Infantry Regiment at the Strymon sector of the Macedonian front. In 1919 he participated with his regiment in the Allied intervention in Ukraine, landing at Odessa. 

He retired in 1920 with the rank of Colonel, and engaged in politics in his home town of Nafplio. Upon his death in 1923, the Greek government promoted him to the rank of Major General.

References

1868 births
1923 deaths
20th-century Greek people
Hellenic Army major generals
Greek military personnel of the Balkan Wars
Greek military personnel of the Greco-Turkish War (1897)
Greek military personnel of World War I
People from Nafplion
People of the Macedonian Struggle
Greek military personnel of the Russian Civil War